Omicron (B.1.1.529) is a variant of SARS-CoV-2 first reported to the World Health Organization (WHO) by the Network for Genomics Surveillance in South Africa on 24 November 2021. It was first detected in Botswana and has spread to become the predominant variant in circulation around the world. Following the original B.1.1.529 variant, several subvariants of Omicron have emerged including: BA.1, BA.2, BA.3, BA.4, and BA.5. Since October 2022, two subvariants of BA.5 called BQ.1 and BQ.1.1 have emerged.

Three doses of a COVID-19 vaccine provide protection against severe disease and hospitalisation caused by Omicron and its subvariants. For three-dose vaccinated individuals, the BA.4 and BA.5 variants are more infectious than previous subvariants but there is no evidence of greater sickness or severity.



Classification 

On 26 November 2021, the WHO's Technical Advisory Group on SARS-CoV-2 Virus Evolution declared PANGO lineage B.1.1.529 a variant of concern and designated it with the Greek letter omicron. The WHO skipped the preceding letters nu and xi in the Greek alphabet to avoid confusion with the similarities of the English word "new" and the Chinese surname Xi.

The name of the variant has occasionally been mistaken as "Omnicron" among some English speakers, due to a lack of familiarity with the Greek alphabet, and the relative frequency of the Latin prefix "omni" in other common speech.

The GISAID project has assigned it the clade identifier GR/484A, and the Nextstrain project has assigned it the clade identifiers 21K and 21L, both belonging to a larger Omicron group 21M.

History 
Omicron was first detected on 22 November 2021 in laboratories in Botswana and South Africa based on samples collected on 11–16 November, with the first known samples collected in Johannesburg, South Africa on 8 November 2021. The first known cases outside of South Africa were two people who travelled on 11 November: one who flew from South Africa to Hong Kong via Qatar, and another who travelled from Egypt to Belgium via Turkey. On 26 November 2021, WHO designated B.1.1.529 as a variant of concern and named it "Omicron", after the fifteenth letter in the Greek alphabet. As of 6 January 2022, the variant had been confirmed in 149 countries.

Origin hypotheses 
Omicron did not evolve from any other variant, but instead diverged on a distinct track, perhaps in mid-2020. Competing hypotheses are being examined.

One origin hypothesis is that various mutations in the Omicron variant, comprising a 9-nucleotide sequence, may have been acquired from another coronavirus (known as HCoV-229E), responsible for the common cold.  This is not entirely at times, viruses within the body acquire and swap segments of genetic material from each other, and this is one common means of mutation.

A link with HIV infection may explain a large number of mutations in the sequence of the Omicron variant. Indeed, in order to be affected by such a high number of mutations, the virus must have been able to evolve a long time without killing its host, which can occur in people with a weakened immune system who receive enough medical care to survive. This is the case in HIV patients in South Africa, who represent about 14% of the population (as of 2017). HIV prevention could be key to reducing the risk of uncontrolled HIV driving the emergence of SARS-CoV-2 variants.

One hypothesis to explain the novel mutations is that SARS-CoV-2 was transmitted from humans to mice and mutated in a population of mice sometime between mid-2020 and late 2021 before reinfecting humans.

On 1 December 2022, a team of researchers from the Charité (Berlin) published a study in Science (journal) that claimed that "data revealed genetically diverse Omicron ancestors already existed across Africa by August 2021". After a re-analysis because of doubts, the team has retracted the article on 20 December 2022 due to contamination of the samples.

Spread 
On 24 November 2021, the variant was first reported to the WHO from South Africa based on samples that had been collected from 14 to 16 November. South African scientists were first alerted by samples from the very beginning of November where the PCR tests had S gene target failure (occurs in a few variants, but not in Delta which dominated in the country in October) and by a sudden increase of COVID-19 cases in Gauteng; sequencing revealed that more than 70 percent of samples collected in the province between 14 and 23 November were a new variant.

The first confirmed specimens of Omicron were collected on 8 November 2021 in South Africa and on 9 November in Botswana. Likely Omicron (SGTF) samples had occurred  on 4 November 2021 in Pretoria, South Africa.

When WHO was alerted on 24 November, Hong Kong was the only place outside Africa that had confirmed a case of Omicron; one person who traveled from South Africa on 11 November, and another traveler who was cross-infected by this case while staying in the same quarantine hotel.

On 25 November, one confirmed case was identified in Israel from a traveler returning from Malawi, along with two who returned from South Africa and one from Madagascar. All four initial cases reported from Botswana occurred among fully vaccinated individuals.

On 26 November, Belgium confirmed its first case; an unvaccinated person who had travelled from Egypt via Turkey on 11 November. All three initial confirmed and suspected cases reported from Israel occurred among fully vaccinated individuals, as did a single suspected case in Germany.

On 27 November, two cases were detected in the United Kingdom, another two in Munich, Germany and one in Milan, Italy.

On 28 November, 13 cases were confirmed in the Netherlands among the 624 airline passengers who arrived from South Africa on 26 November. Confirmation of a further 5 cases among these passengers followed later. Entry into the Netherlands generally required having been vaccinated or PCR-tested, or having recovered. The passengers of these two flights had been tested upon arrival because of the newly imposed restrictions (which were set in place during their flight), after which 61 tested positive for SARS-CoV-2. A further two cases were detected in Australia. Both people landed in Sydney the previous day, and travelled from southern Africa to Sydney Airport via Doha Airport. The two people, who were fully vaccinated, entered isolation; 12 other travellers from southern Africa also entered quarantine for fourteen days, while about 260 other passengers and crew on the flight were directed to isolate. Two travellers from South Africa who landed in Denmark tested positive for COVID-19; it was confirmed on 28 November that both carried the Omicron variant. On the same day, Austria also confirmed its first Omicron case. A detected Omicron case was reported in the Czech Republic, from a traveler who spent time in Namibia. Canada also reported its first Omicron cases, with two from travelers from Nigeria, therefore becoming the first North American country to report an Omicron case.

On 29 November, a positive case was recorded in Darwin, Australia. The person arrived in Darwin on a repatriation flight from Johannesburg, South Africa on 25 November, and was taken to a quarantine facility, where the positive test was recorded. Two more people who travelled to Sydney from southern Africa via Singapore tested positive. Portugal reported 13 Omicron cases, all of them members of a soccer club. Sweden also confirmed their first case on 29 November, as did Spain, when a traveler came from South Africa.

On 30 November, the Netherlands reported that Omicron cases had been detected in two samples dating back as early as 19 November. A positive case was recorded in Sydney from a traveller who had visited southern Africa before travel restrictions were imposed, and was subsequently active in the community. Japan also confirmed its first case. Two Israeli doctors tested positive and entered isolation. Both of them had received three shots of the Pfizer vaccine prior to testing positive. In Brazil, three cases of the Omicron variant were confirmed in São Paulo. Another five are under suspicion. A person in Leipzig, Germany with no travel history nor contact with travellers tested positive for Omicron.

On 1 December, the Omicron variant was detected in three samples in Nigeria that had been collected from travelers from South Africa within the last week. On the same day, public health authorities in the United States announced the country's first confirmed Omicron case. A resident of San Francisco who had been vaccinated returned from South Africa on 22 November, began showing mild symptoms on 25 November and was confirmed to have a mild case of COVID-19 on 29 November. Ireland and South Korea also reported their first cases. South Korea reported its cases from five travelers arriving in South Korea from Nigeria.

On 2 December, Dutch health authorities confirmed that all 14 passengers with confirmed Omicron infection on 26 November had been previously vaccinated. The same day, the Norwegian Institute of Public Health confirmed that 50 attendees of a company Christmas party held at a restaurant in Norway's capital, Oslo, were infected with the Omicron variant. France has confirmed only 25 cases of the new Omicron variant but officials say the number could jump significantly in the coming weeks.

By 6 December, Malaysia confirmed its first case of the variant. The case was a South African student entering to study at a private university. In Namibia, 18 cases out of 19 positive COVID-19 samples that had been collected between 11 and 26 November were found to be Omicron, indicating a high level of prevalence in the country. Fiji also confirmed two positive cases of the variant. They travelled from Nigeria arriving in Fiji on November 25.

On 9 December, Richard Mihigo, coordinator of the World Health Organisation's Immunisation and Vaccine Development Programme for Africa, announced that Africa accounted for 46% of reported cases of the Omicron variant globally.

On 13 December, the first death of a person with Omicron was reported in the UK.

On 16 December, New Zealand confirmed its first case of the Omicron variant, an individual who had traveled from Germany via Dubai.

The first death of a person with Omicron was reported in Germany on 23 December and in Australia on 27 December.

By Christmas 2021, the Omicron Strain became dominant in the US.

On 3 January 2022, South Korea reported the first two deaths of people who tested positive post mortem for Omicron.

On 29 March 2022, Omicron subvariant BA.2 overtook BA.1 and became the dominant strain in the U.S.

As of May 2022, BA.2.12.1 was spreading in the US and two new subvariants of Omicron named BA.4 and BA.5, first detected in January 2022, spread in South Africa. All 3 subvariants have spike protein mutations of L452 and elude immunity from prior BA1 infection.

Reactions

Vaccine producers 
On 26 November 2021, BioNTech said it would know in two weeks whether the current vaccine is effective against the variant and that an updated vaccine could be shipped in 100 days if necessary. AstraZeneca, Moderna and Johnson & Johnson were also studying the variant's impact on the effectiveness of their vaccines. On the same day, Novavax stated that it was developing an updated vaccine requiring two doses for the Omicron variant, which the company expected to be ready for testing and manufacturing within a few weeks. On 29 November 2021, The Gamaleya Institute said that Sputnik Light should be effective against the variant, that it would begin adapting Sputnik V, and that a modified version could be ready for mass production in 45 days. Sinovac said it could quickly mass-produce an inactivated vaccine against the variant and that it was monitoring studies and collecting samples of the variant to determine if a new vaccine is needed.

On 7 December 2021, at a symposium in Brazil with its partner Instituto Butantan, Sinovac said it would update its vaccine to the new variant and make it available in three months. On 2 December, the Finlay Institute was already developing a version of Soberana Plus against the variant. Pfizer hoped to have a vaccine targeted to immunize against Omicron ready by March 2022.

World Health Organization 

On 26 November 2021, the WHO asked nations to enhance surveillance and sequencing efforts, submit complete genome sequences and associated metadata to a publicly available database, such as GISAID, report initial cases/clusters associated with virus-of-concern infection to WHO through the IHR mechanism, where capacity exists and in coordination with the international community, perform field investigations and laboratory assessments to improve understanding of the potential impacts of the virus of concern on COVID-19 epidemiology, severity, and the effectiveness of public health and social measures, diagnostic methods, immune responses, antibody neutralization, or other relevant characteristics.
On 26 November 2021, WHO advised countries not to impose new restrictions on travel, instead recommending a "risk-based and scientific" approach to travel measures. On the same day, the European Centre for Disease Prevention and Control (ECDC) reported modeling indicating that strict travel restrictions would delay the variant's impact on European countries by two weeks, possibly allowing countries to prepare for it.
As with other variants, the WHO recommended that people continue to keep enclosed spaces well ventilated, avoid crowding and close contact, wear well-fitting masks, clean hands frequently, and get vaccinated. On 29 November 2021, the WHO said cases and infections were expected among those vaccinated, albeit in a small and predictable proportion.

International response 
After the WHO announcement, on the same day, several countries announced travel bans from southern Africa in response to the identification of the variant, including the United States, which banned travel from eight African countries, although as of 30 November 2021 it notably did not ban travel from any European countries, Israel, Canada, or Australia where cases were also detected at the time the bans were announced. Other countries that also implemented travel bans include Japan, Canada, the European Union, Israel, Australia, the United Kingdom, Singapore, Malaysia, Indonesia, Morocco, and New Zealand.

On 26 November 2021 the Brazilian Health Regulatory Agency recommended flight restrictions regarding the new variant. The state of New York declared a state of emergency ahead of a potential Omicron spike, although no cases had yet been detected in the state or the rest of the United States. On 27 November 2021, Switzerland introduced obligatory tests and quarantine for all visitors arriving from countries where the variant was detected, which originally included Belgium and Israel.

On 26 November 2021 South African Minister of Health Joe Phaahla defended his country's handling of the pandemic and said that travel bans went against the "norms and standards" of the World Health Organization.

Some speculated that travel bans could have a significant impact on South Africa's economy by limiting tourism and could lead to other countries with economies that are reliant on tourism to hide the discovery of new variants of concern. Low vaccine coverage in less-developed nations could create opportunities for the emergence of new variants, and these nations also were struggling to gain intellectual property to develop and produce vaccines locally. At the same time, inoculation had slowed in South Africa due to vaccine hesitancy and apathy, with a nationwide vaccination rate of only 35% as of November 24, 2021.

On 29 November 2021, the WHO warned countries that the variant poses a very high global risk with severe consequences and that they should prepare by accelerating vaccination of high-priority groups and strengthening health systems. WHO director-general Tedros Adhanom described the global situation as dangerous and precarious and called for a new agreement on the handling of pandemics, as the current system disincentivizes countries from alerting others to threats that will inevitably land on their shores. CEPI CEO Richard Hatchett said that the variant fulfilled predictions that transmission of the virus in low-vaccination areas would accelerate its evolution.

In preparation for the Omicron variant arriving in the United States, President Joe Biden stated that the variant is "cause for concern, not panic", reiterated that the government was prepared for the variant and would have it under control and that large-scale lockdowns, similar to the ones in 2020 near the beginning of the pandemic, were "off the table for now."

In mid-December 2021, multiple Canadian provinces reinstated restrictions on gatherings and events such as sports tournaments, and tightened enforcement of proof of vaccination orders. British Columbia expressly prohibited any non-seated "organized New Year's Eve event", while Quebec announced a partial lockdown on 20 December 2021, ordering the closure of all bars, casinos, gyms, schools, and theatres, as well as imposing restrictions on the capacity and operating hours of restaurants, and the prohibition of spectators at professional sporting events.

On 18 December 2021, the Netherlands government announced a lockdown intended to prevent spread of the variant during the holiday period.

In late December 2021, some countries shortened the typical six-month interval for a booster dose of the vaccine to prepare for a wave of Omicron, as two doses are not enough to stop the infection. UK, South Korea and Thailand reduced to three months; Belgium, four months; France, Singapore, Taiwan, Italy and Australia, five months. Finland reduced it to three months for risk groups. Other countries continued with a six-month booster schedule. While antibody levels begin to drop at four months, a longer interval usually allows time for the immune system's response to mature.

Market reactions 

On 26 November 2021, worry about the potential economic impact of the Omicron variant led to a drop in global markets, including the worst drop of the Dow Jones Industrial Average in 2021, led by travel-related stocks. The price of Brent Crude and West Texas Intermediate oil fell 10% and 11.7%, respectively Cryptocurrency markets were also routed. and the South African rand also hit an all-time low for 2021, trading at over 16 rand to the dollar, losing 6% of its value in November.

In early December 2021, Jerome Powell, the chairman of the Federal Reserve, testified before the U.S. Senate Committee on Banking that "The recent rise in COVID-19 cases and the emergence of the Omicron variant pose downside risks to employment and economic activity and increased uncertainty for inflation."

Biology

Mutations 
As of June 2022, Omicron had about 50 mutations, which is more than any previous SARS-CoV-2 variant, 32 of which pertained to the spike protein, which most vaccines target to neutralise the virus. As of December 2021, many mutations were novel and not found in previous variants. As of April 2022 the variant was characterised by 30 amino acid changes, three small deletions, and one small insertion in the spike protein compared with the original virus, of which 15 are located in the receptor-binding domain (residues 319–541). As of December 2022 the virus carried a number of changes and deletions in other genomic regions. For example three mutations at the furin cleavage site, which facilitates its transmission.

Subvariants 
Several subvariants of Omicron have been discovered and new ones continue to emerge. There are 310 Pango lineages currently associated with the Omicron variant. The 'standard' sublineage is now referred to as BA.1 (or B.1.1.529.1), and the two other sublineages are known as BA.2 (or B.1.1.529.2) and BA.3 (or B.1.1.529.3). In mid-2022, BA.4 (or B.1.1.529.4) and BA.5 (or B.1.1.529.5) were detected in several countries. They share many mutations, but also significantly differ. In general, BA.1 and BA.2 share 32 mutations, but differ by 28. BA.1 has itself been divided in two, the original BA.1 and BA.1.1 (or B.1.1.529.1.1) where the main difference is that the latter has a R346K mutation.

Standard PCR and rapid tests continue to detect all Omicron subvariants as COVID-19, but further tests are necessary to distinguish the subvariants from each other and from other COVID-19 variants.

BA.2 
A preprint released in February 2022 (published in May) suggested that BA.2 is more transmissible than BA.1 and may cause more severe disease. This was later disproven by a study in late-October 2022, that found BA.2 actually caused less severe disease relative to BA.1 (which in turn, caused less severe disease compared to the delta variant). Therapeutic monoclonal antibodies used to treat people infected with COVID-19 did not have much effect on BA.2, which was "almost completely resistant" to casirivimab and imdevimab, and 35 times more resistant to sotrovimab than the BA.1 subvariant.

Affected countries and transmissibility 
According to early research, BA.2 is roughly 30% to 60% more transmissible than BA.1.

The first known sequence of BA.2 was in a sample from 15 November 2021. As of 17 January 2022, BA.2 had been detected in at least 40 countries and in all continents except Antarctica. By 31 January, it had been detected in at least 57 countries. In global samples collected from 4 February to 5 March and uploaded to GISAID, BA.2 accounted for c. 34%, compared to 41% for BA.1.1, 25% for BA.1 and less than 1% for BA.3. In a review two weeks later, covering 16 February to 17 March, BA.2 had become the most frequent. Based on GISAID uploads, BA.1 peaked in early January 2022, after which it was overtaken by both BA.1.1 and BA.2. In North America, parts of Europe and parts of Asia, BA.1 was first outcompeted by BA.1.1. For example, in the United States, France and Japan, BA.1.1 became the dominant subvariant in January 2022.

By late December 2021/early January 2022, BA.2 appeared to have become dominant in at least parts of India (already making up almost 80 percent in Kolkata in late December 2021) and the Philippines, had become frequent in Scandinavia, South Africa and Singapore, and was showing signs of growth in Germany and the United Kingdom. In Japan, which has quarantine and detailed screening of all international travellers, as of 24 January, the vast majority of BA.2 had been detected in people that had arrived from India or the Philippines with cases going back at least to 1 December 2021 (far fewer BA.1 or other variants were detected among arrivals from the two countries in that period), but small numbers had also been detected in people arriving from other countries.

In Denmark, the first BA.2 was in a sample collected on 5 December 2021 and extremely few were found in the directly following period. By week fifty (13–19 December) it had started to increase, with BA.2 being at around 2 percent of sequenced cases compared to 46 percent BA.1 (remaining Delta). The frequency of both Omicron subvariants continued to increase throughout the last half of December; in week fifty-two (27 December–2 January), BA.2 had reached 20 percent and BA.1 peaked at 72 percent. In January 2022, BA.1 began decreasing, whereas BA.2 continued its increase. By the second week (10–16 January) of 2022, the frequency of the two was almost equal, both being near 50 percent (around one percent was the rapidly disappearing Delta). In the following week, BA.2 became clearly dominant in Denmark with 65 percent of new cases being the BA.2 subvariant. Trends from the other Scandinavian countries, India, South Africa and the United Kingdom also showed that BA.2 was increasing in proportion to BA.1. In early February 2022, it had become the dominant subvariant in South Africa, in late February it had become dominant in Germany and in early March it had become dominant in the United Kingdom. In early March, BA.1.1 was still heavily dominant in the United States (having overtaken BA.1 in January), but BA.2 was increasing in frequency, later becoming dominant in the US by 29 March.

BA.2.12 
There were two new BA.2 subvariants detected in the US state of New York, which are BA.2.12 (or B.1.1.529.2.12) and BA.2.12.1 (or B.1.1.529.2.12.1), both of which have a significant growth advantage of 23–27% over BA.2 and contributing to a rise in infections in central New York, centred on Syracuse and Lake Ontario, which later became dominant by May 24 in the US.

BA.2.75 and BA.2.75.2 
The subvariant BA.2.75 (or B.1.1.529.2.75, nicknamed Centaurus by the media), first detected in India in May 2022, has been classified as variant under monitoring by the WHO. Additional newer mutations in this line (like BA.2.75.2 aka B.1.1.529.2.75.2 or Chiron) may be capable of escaping neutralizing antibodies.

XBB and XBB.1 

XBB, a recombinant of the BA.2.10.1 and BA.2.75 sublineages, is an Omicron subvariant first detected in August 2022.

On 20 October 2022, the chief scientist of the World Health Organization (WHO), Soumya Swaminathan, warned that the XBB subvariant of Omicron may cause infections in some countries while the severity of the new variants is not yet known.

On 9 January 2023 the European CDC said there was suggestive evidence the XBB.1.5 variant had a growth advantage; after becoming dominant in the USA, it might become dominant in Europe in the following months. From preliminary evidence they had assessed the XBB variants had no effect on disease severity and transmissibility.

BA.3 
The third Omicron sublineage, BA.3, is very rare. It has the same S-gene target failure (SGTF) deletion (Δ69-70) as BA.1.

XE 
A new BA.1–BA.2 recombinant isolated from the UK in January 2022, dubbed the "XE" recombinant, was found by the WHO to be potentially 10% more transmissible than BA.2, making it about 43% to 76% to more transmissible than BA.1, and making the XE recombinant the most contagious variant identified.

BA.4 and BA.5 
In April 2022, the WHO announced it was tracking the BA.4 and BA.5 subvariants with BA.4 having been detected in South Africa, Botswana, Denmark, Scotland and England. Early indications from data collected in South Africa suggested BA.4 and BA.5 have a significant growth advantage over BA.2, which by 12 May earned the status Variant of Concern by the European Centre for Disease Prevention and Control, and, by 20 May, by the UK Health Security Agency. BA.5 was dominant in Portugal by 25 May, accounting for two-thirds of all new cases there. By 24 June, BA.4 and BA.5 together had become dominant variants in the UK and Germany. These two subvariants became dominant in the United States by 28 June. By late June, BA.5 became the dominant subvariant in France, with 59% of new cases linked to it.

On 10 May 2022, a case of a new subvariant BA.5.2.1 was reported in California. On 10 July, the city of Shanghai reported its first case of BA.5.2.1, in a man who had flown in from Uganda, sparking a new wave of testing.  On 22 July, the province of Ontario, Canada announced that subvariant BA.5.2.1 overtook BA.2.12.1 as the main variant in circulation in Ontario around 2 July.  Regeneron is reporting that BA.5.2.1 is the main variant in Australia, Belgium, Brunei, Greece and Iceland.  The government of Canada also reported in late June and July, of the travelers arriving by air who test positive for COVID-19, a substantial proportion were BA.5.2.1.  BF.7 is a shortened version of the sub-variants full name, which is BA.5.2.1.7. This sub-variant is part of Omicron's BA.5 variant, which had the highest number of reported cases globally, accounting for 76.2% of all cases.

BQ.1 and BQ.1.1 
Since October 2022, two BA.5 subvariants were found: BQ.1 (or B.1.1.529.5.3.1.1.1.1.1) and BQ.1.1 (or B.1.1.529.5.3.1.1.1.1.1.1). They have been more prevalent in France than any other European country. As of 17 November, 93% of sequences in France were Omicron sub-lineage BA.5 and among the BA.5 sub-lineages, BQ.1.1 continued to rise (32% vs 25% in the prior week). according to Nextclade even 55%. they were reported in the US to have become dominant, accounting for 44% of new infections, up from 33% the previous week. Early laboratory tests found that these subvariants were better at escaping first and booster vaccines than previous variants; however, no new treatments appeared to be in development.

Transmission

In humans 
In January 2022, William Schaffner, professor of infectious diseases at Vanderbilt University Medical Center, compared the contagiousness of the Omicron variant to that of the measles.

Vaccinated 
It was not known in November 2021 how Omicron would spread in populations with high levels of immunity or if it causes a milder or more severe disease. On 15 December 2021, Jenny Harries, head of the UK Health Security Agency, told a parliamentary committee that the doubling time of COVID-19 in most regions of the UK was now less than two days despite the country's high vaccination rate. She said that the Omicron variant of COVID-19 is "probably the most significant threat since the start of the pandemic", and that the number of cases in the next few days would be "quite staggering compared to the rate of growth that we've seen in cases for previous variants".

Natural immunity 
Relating to naturally acquired immunity, Anne von Gottberg, an expert at the South African National Institute for Communicable Diseases, believed at the beginning of December 2021 that immunity granted by previous variants would not protect against Omicron.

Vaccinated or natural immunity 
A study suggests that mutations that promote breakthrough infections or antibody-resistance "like those in Omicron" could be a new mechanism for viral evolution success of SARS-CoV-2 and that such may become a dominating mechanism of its evolution. A preprint supports such an explanation of Omicron's spread, suggesting that it "primarily can be ascribed to the immune evasiveness rather than an inherent increase in the basic transmissibility". Studies showed the variant to escape the majority of existing SARS-CoV-2 neutralizing antibodies, including those in sera from vaccinated and convalescent individuals. Nevertheless, current vaccines are expected to protect against severe illness, hospitalizations, and deaths due to Omicron and, on an individual level, the Omicron variant is milder than earlier variants that evolved when the antibody/vaccination share was lower than it was when Omicron emerged.

In contrast to other investigated variants, Omicron showed substantial, population-level,  evasion of immunity from prior infection as well as a higher ability to evade immunity induced by vaccines.

In non-human animals 
In February 2022, the first confirmed case infecting a wild animal was confirmed by researchers at Pennsylvania State University in white-tailed deer in Staten Island, N.Y.

Surfaces 
Although transmission via fomites is rare, preliminary data indicate that the variant lasts for 194 hours on plastic surfaces and 21 hours on skin, compared with just 56 and 7 hours, respectively, for the original strain.

Vaccine effectiveness 
Pfizer-BioNTech (BNT162b2) and Moderna (mRNA-1273) mRNA vaccines provide reduced protection against asymptomatic disease but do reduce the risk of serious illness.  On 22 December 2021, the Imperial College COVID-19 Response Team reported an about  lower risk of a hospitalization requiring a stay of at least 1 night compared to the Delta variant, and that the data suggested that recipients of 2 doses of the Pfizer–BioNTech, the Moderna or the Oxford–AstraZeneca vaccine were substantially protected from hospitalization. In January 2022, results from Israel suggested that a fourth dose is only partially effective against Omicron. Many cases of infection broke through, albeit "a bit less than in the control group", even though trial participants had higher antibody levels after the fourth dose. On 23 December 2021, Nature indicates that, though Omicron likely weakens vaccine protection, reasonable effectiveness against Omicron may be maintained with currently available vaccination and boosting approaches.

In December, studies, some of which using large nationwide datasets from either Israel and Denmark, found that vaccine effectiveness of multiple common two-dosed COVID-19 vaccines is substantially lower against the Omicron variant than for other common variants including the Delta variant, and that a new (often a third) dose – a booster dose – is needed and effective, as it substantially reduces deaths from the disease compared to cohorts who received no booster but two doses.

Vaccines continue to be recommended for Omicron and its subvariants. Professor Paul Morgan, immunologist at Cardiff University said, "I think a blunting rather than a complete loss [of immunity] is the most likely outcome. The virus can't possibly lose every single epitope on its surface, because if it did that spike protein couldn't work any more. So, while some of the antibodies and T cell clones made against earlier versions of the virus, or against the vaccines may not be effective, there will be others, which will remain effective. (...) If half, or two-thirds, or whatever it is, of the immune response is not going to be effective, and you're left with the residual half, then the more boosted that is the better." Professor Francois Balloux of the Genetics Institute at University College London said, "From what we have learned so far, we can be fairly confident that – compared with other variants – Omicron tends to be better able to reinfect people who have been previously infected and received some protection against COVID-19.  That is pretty clear and was anticipated from the mutational changes we have pinpointed in its protein structure. These make it more difficult for antibodies to neutralise the virus."

BA.1 and BA.2 
A January 2022 study by the UK Health Security Agency found that vaccines afforded similar levels of protection against symptomatic disease by BA.1 and BA.2, and in both it was considerably higher after two doses and a booster than two doses without booster, though because of the gradually waning effect of vaccines, further booster vaccination may later be necessary.

BA.4 and BA.5 
In May 2022, a preprint indicated Omicron subvariants BA.4 and BA.5 could cause a large share of COVID-19 reinfections, beyond the increase of reinfections caused by the Omicron lineage, even for people who were infected by Omicron BA.1 due to increases in immune evasion, especially for the unvaccinated. However, the observed escape of BA.4 and BA.5 from immunity by a BA.1 infection is more moderate than of BA.1 against studied prior cases of immunity (such as immunity from specific vaccines).

Immunity from an Omicron infection for unvaccinated and previously uninfected was found to be weak "against non-Omicron variants", albeit at the time Omicron is, by a large margin, the dominant variant in sequenced human cases.

BQ.1 and BQ.1.1 
Subvariants BQ.1 and BQ.1.1 were found in late 2022 to be
better at escaping first and booster vaccines than previous variants, and "to have pretty much eliminated every single monoclonal antibody on the market right now in terms of their efficacy".

Vaccine adjustments 
In June 2022, researchers, health organizations and regulators were discussing, investigating (including with preliminary laboratory studies and trials) and partly recommending COVID-19 vaccine boosters that mix the original vaccine formulation with Omicron-adjusted parts – such as spike proteins of a specific Omicron subvariant – to better prepare the immune system to recognize a wide variety of variants amid substantial and ongoing immune evasion by Omicron (and other SARS-CoV-2 variants).

In June 2022 Pfizer and Moderna developed bivalent vaccines to protect against the SARS-COV-2 wild-type and the Omicron variant. The bivalent vaccines are well-tolerated and offer immunity to omicron superior to previous mRNA vaccines. The United States Food and Drug Administration (FDA) has authorized the bivalent vaccines for use in the USA .

Signs and symptoms 
 Loss of taste and smell seem to be uncommon compared to other strains. A unique reported symptom of the Omicron variant is night sweats, particularly with the BA.5 subvariant. A study performed between 1 and 7 December 2021 by the Center for Disease Control found that: "The most commonly reported symptoms [were] cough, fatigue, and congestion or runny nose" making it difficult to distinguish from a less damaging variant or another virus. Research published in London on 25 December 2021 suggested the most frequent symptoms stated by users of the Zoe Covid app were "a runny nose, headaches, fatigue, sneezing and sore throats."
A British Omicron case-control observational study until March 2022 showed a reduction in odds of long COVID with the Omicron variant versus the Delta variant of 0·24–0·5 depending on age and time since vaccination.

Virulence 
As of 6 January 2022, Omicron multiplied around 70 times faster than the Delta variant in the bronchi (lung airways) but evidence suggested it is less severe than previous variants, especially compared to Delta, since it might be less able to penetrate deep lung tissue. As of January 2022, in southern California infections were 91 percent less fatal than the delta variant, with 51 percent less risk of hospitalization. However, the estimated difference in the intrinsic risk of hospitalization in England largely decreased to 0–30 percent, when reinfections were excluded.

BA.1 and BA.2 differences 
As of 21 January 2022 the risk of hospitalization was the same in BA.1 and BA.2 based on reviews from Denmark, India, South Africa and the United Kingdom. Norwegian studies showed that the amount of virus in the upper airways was similar in those infected with BA.1 and BA.2.

Diagnosis 
 As of November 2021, the chance of detecting an Omicron case particularly depended on a country's sequencing rate, with South Africa sequencing far more samples than any other country in Africa, but at a considerably lower rate than most Western nations. Furthermore, it could take up to two weeks to return a viral sequence in places with the technical capability, hence solid statistics on confirmed cases have lagged the actual situation.

PCR testing 
In December 2021, the US FDA published guidelines on how PCR tests would be affected by Omicron. Tests that detect multiple gene targets were to continue to identify the testee as positive for COVID-19. S-gene dropout or target failure was proposed as a shorthand way of differentiating Omicron from Delta. besides sequencing and genotyping.

As of December 2021, Denmark and Norway have regarded cases found by their variant qPCR test, which is relatively fast and checks several genes, as sufficient for counting it as Omicron, before full sequencing.

BA.1 and BA.2 differences 
As of 7 December 2021 it was known that BA.2 -unlike Ba1- lacks the characteristic S-gene target failure (SGTF) causing deletion (Δ69-70), by which many qPCR tests have been able to rapidly detect a case as an Omicron (or Alpha) variant, from the previously dominant Delta variant. Thus, countries which primarily rely on SGTF for detection may overlook BA.2, and British authorities consider SGTF alone as insufficient for monitoring the spread of Omicron. This has resulted in it having been nicknamed 'Stealth Omicron', but because BA.2 still can be separated from other variants through normal full sequencing, or checks of certain other mutations, the nickname is not quite accurate. As of January 2022, some countries, such as Denmark and Japan, have been using a variant qPCR which tests for several mutations, including L452R. It can also distinguish Delta, which has L452R, and all Omicron subvariants, which do not have L452R. As Omicron became dominant and the Delta variant became rare in early 2022, the SGTF mutation that had made Delta and BA.2 similar in qPCR tests was found to be useful for separating BA.1 and BA.2 from each other.

Rapid antigen testing 

In January 2022 the medicine and therapeutic regulatory agency Therapeutic Goods Administration (TGA) of the Australian Government found that only one of their 23 approved COVID-19 rapid antigen tests (RAT) stated that it detected Omicron. In June 2022, the German federal Paul-Ehrlich-Institute published their findings, that most RATs detected the Omicron Variant.

Treatment 

As of 28 November 2021, Corticosteroids such as dexamethasone and IL6 receptor blockers such as tocilizumab (Actemra) were known to be effective for managing patients with the earlier strains of severe COVID-19 but the impact on the effectiveness of other treatments was being assessed.

Relating to monoclonal antibodies (mAbs) treatments, similar testing and research is ongoing. Preclinical data on in vitro pseudotyped virus data demonstrate that some mAbs designed to use highly conserved epitopes retain neutralizing activity against key mutations of Omicron substitutions.
Similar results are confirmed by cryo-electron microscopy and X-ray data, also providing the structural approach and molecular basis for the evasion of humoral immunity exhibited by Omicron antigenic shift as well as the importance of targeting conserved epitopes for vaccine and therapeutics design. While 7 clinical mAbs or mAb cocktails experienced loss of neutralizing activity of 1-2 orders of magnitude or greater relative to the prototypic virus, the S309 mAb, the parent mAb of sotrovimab, neutralized Omicron with only 2-3-fold reduced potency.

As of December 2021, most monoclonal antibodies had lost in vitro neutralizing activity against Omicron, with only 3 out of 29 mAbs examined in another study retaining unaltered potency. Furthermore, a fraction of broadly neutralizing sarbecovirus mAbs neutralized Omicron through recognition of antigenic sites outside the RBM, including sotrovimab (VIR-7831), S2X259 and S2H97. However, sotrovimab was not fully active against the BA.2 Omicron sublineage, and in March2022 the office of the U.S. ASPR stopped distributing the antibody treatment to states where BA.2 was dominant.
February 2022 data suggested Omicron caused significant humoral immune evasion, while neutralizing antibodies targeting the sarbecovirus conserved region remained most effective.

Epidemiology 
On 26 November 2021, the South African National Institute for Communicable Diseases announced that 30,904 COVID-19-tests (in one day) detected 2,828 new COVID-19 infections (a 9.2% positivity rate).
One week later, on 3 December 2021, the NICD announced that 65,990 COVID-19 tests had found 16,055 new infections (5.7 times as many as seven days before; positive rate 24.3%) and that 72 percent of them were found in Gauteng.
This province of South Africa is densely populated at about 850 inhabitants per km2. Gauteng's capital Johannesburg is a megacity (about 5.5 million inhabitants in the city itself plus 9.5 million in the urban region).

In November 2021, the transmissibility of the Omicron variant, as compared to the Delta variant or other variants of the COVID-19 virus, was still uncertain. Omicron is frequently able to infect previously COVID-19-positive people.

It has been estimated the Omicron variant diverged in late September or early October 2021, based on Omicron genome comparisons.
Sequencing data suggests that Omicron had become the dominant variant in South Africa by November 2021, the same month where it had been first identified in the country.

Phylogeny suggests a recent emergence. Data from South Africa suggests that Omicron has a pronounced growth advantage there. However, this may be due to transmissibility or immune escape related, or both." Also the serial interval plays a role in the growth.

Detectable changes in levels of COVID-19 in wastewater samples from South Africa's Gauteng province were seen as early as 17–23 October (week 42). The National Institute for Communicable Diseases reports that children under the age of 2 make up 10% of total hospital admissions in the Omicron point of discovery Tshwane in South Africa. Data on the S gene target failure (SGTF) of sampled cases in South Africa indicates a growth of 21% per day relative to Delta, generating an increased reproduction number by a factor of 2.4. Omicron became the majority strain in South Africa around 10 November. Another analysis showed 32% growth per day in Gauteng, South Africa, having become dominant there around 6 November.

In the UK, the logarithmic growth rate of Omicron-associated S gene target failure (SGTF) cases over S gene target positive (SGTP) cases was estimated at 0.37 per day, which is exceptionally high. Furthermore, by 14 December it appears to have become the most dominant strain. Without presuming behavior change in response to the variant, a million infections per day by 24 December are projected for a 2.5 days doubling time. In Denmark, the growth rate has been roughly similar with a doubling time of about 2–3 days, it having become the most prevalent strain on 17 December. Switzerland is not far behind. In Germany Omicron became the most prevalent variant on 1 January. In Scotland, Omicron apparently became the most prevalent variant on 17 December. In the Canadian province of Ontario it became the most prevalent strain on 13 December. In the US, the variant appears to have become the most prevalent strain on 18 December, growing at 0.24 per day. In Portugal, Omicron had reached 61.5% of cases on 22 December. In Belgium, the strain has become the most prevalent on 25 December, and in the Netherlands on 28 December. In Italy, it had reached 28% of cases on 20 December and was doubling every two days, while it became the dominant variant in Norway on 25 December. In France, it made up about 15% of COVID-19 cases in mid-December, but around 27 December it had increased to more than 60%. Researchers recommend sampling at least 5% of COVID-19 patient samples in order to detect Omicron or other emerging variants.

During January 2022, in Denmark the BA.2 variant grew at ~0.10 per day (+11% per day) as a ratio to BA.1 (the legacy Omicron variant), and became the dominant strain in week 2, 2022. In the United Kingdom, the BA.2 variant was growing at ~0.11 per day (+12% per day) as a ratio to BA.1.

On 13 January 2022, the BBC reported that the hospitalization rate was higher in the US and Canada than in Europe and South Africa. This was attributed to a combination of a greater number of elderly people than in South Africa, greater prevalence of comorbidities such as hypertension and obesity than in Europe, higher indoor transmission due to the winter, lower vaccination rate in the US than in Europe and Canada, and a possible still high prevalence of the Delta variant, which more often leads to hospitalization.

Reported cases

See also 

 COVID-19 pandemic in Africa
 COVID-19 vaccination in Africa
 COVID-19 vaccination in Botswana
 COVID-19 vaccination in South Africa
 Timeline of the SARS-CoV-2 Omicron variant, (November 2021-February 2022)
 Variants of SARS-CoV-2
 Other variants of either interest or concern: Alpha, Beta, Gamma, Delta, Epsilon, Zeta, Eta, Theta, Iota, Kappa, Lambda, Mu
 Sikhulile Moyo, scientist who discovered SARS-CoV-2 Omicron

Notes

References

Further reading 
 WHO: Update on Omicron
 Live Omicron Variant Location Map
 Omicron variant: What have COVID vaccine makers said and are they working on new doses?

External links 
 
 Archived video:
 
  Also archived at Ghostarchive.

S013
COVID-19 pandemic in South Africa
2021 in health
COVID-19 pandemic in Botswana